Ofer Comay (born 1957) is an Israeli chess problemist and a popular science writer who challenged the standard model of particle physics.

Biography and chess career
At school years Comay won the Israeli Olympiad for Youth in mathematics organized by Weizmann Institute of Science. He graduated from the Tel Aviv University with a master's degree in mathematics. Along with his father, Eliyahu Comay, he founded a software company which specializes in document image understanding.

In 1985 Comay first time won the individual World Chess Solving Championship. In 1986 he gained the title of International Solving Grandmaster. In 1999 Comay second time won the individual World Chess Solving Championship. His hobby is to compose chess problems and mathematical riddles.

Challenging the standard model of particle physics
Comay wrote popular science books about particle physics, which were based on the work of his father, Eliyahu Comay, an Israeli physicist.

In 2014 he published the book title Science or Fiction? which provides more than 20 phenomena which, according to the book, challenge Quantum Chromodynamics, one of the cornerstones of particle physics.

References

External links
 Problems at the PDB-Server
 A blog about particle physics

1957 births
Living people
Israeli chess players
Chess composers
International solving grandmasters
Science writers
Science bloggers
Tel Aviv University alumni